Střevelná is a small village in the Czech Republic, part of a town Železný Brod near Jablonec nad Nisou.

Villages in Jablonec nad Nisou District
Neighbourhoods in the Czech Republic